Barcie can mean:
 Barcie, Warmian-Masurian Voivodeship
 Barcie, West Pomeranian Voivodeship